The Parkview Community Ditch, near Los Ojos, New Mexico, is an  irrigation ditch diverting water from the Brazos River which was dug in 1862.  It was is listed on the National Register of Historic Places in 1986.

It is the longest irrigation ditch in the area, and descends  in elevation from the Ensenada plateau to Parkview.  A flour mill or molino is believed to have existed at the steepest point of the ditch's fall.  It supplies the Ensenada Ditch and the El Porvenir Ditch, both  from Ensenada and also supplies the La Puente Community Ditch, also NRHP-listed.

References

		
National Register of Historic Places in Rio Arriba County, New Mexico
Irrigation canals